The Las Vegas Dustdevils were an indoor soccer team based out of Las Vegas, Nevada that played in the Continental Indoor Soccer League (CISL).  The team won the league championship in 1994, but folded after their second season.

History
On December 1, 1992, the Dustdevils became a charter member of the newly established Continental Indoor Soccer League.  The team ownership, Nevada Pro Sports, planned to play their home games at the MGM Grand Garden Arena, but the facility was not completed until late 1993, causing the Dustdevils to sit out the league’s first season. In 1994, Las Vegas, coached by Guy Newman, finished with a 17–11 regular season record. Once in the playoffs, the team ran to the league title, defeating the Dallas Sidekicks two games to one in the championship series. In 1995, the Dustdevils moved to the Thomas & Mack Center. Despite having a losing record, they made the playoffs, but lost in the quarterfinals.  The team withdrew from the league and disbanded following the loss. They averaged just under 3,000 fans at their home games.

Year-by-year

Honor
League Championship
 Winner (1): 1994

Championship MVP
 Branko Segota: 1994

References

External links
 CISL yearly standings
 Dustdevils logo

Continental Indoor Soccer League teams
Defunct indoor soccer clubs in the United States
Association football clubs established in 1993
Association football clubs disestablished in 1995
Sports teams in Las Vegas
Soccer clubs in Nevada
1993 establishments in Nevada
1995 disestablishments in Nevada
Paradise, Nevada